Pallas's reed bunting (Emberiza pallasi), also known as Pallas's bunting, is a passerine bird in the bunting family Emberizidae, a group now separated by most modern authors from the finches, Fringillidae.

Taxonomy
The bird family Emberizidae contains around 300 seed-eating species, the majority of which are found in the Americas, although the genus Emberiza, with more than 40 members, is confined to the Old World. Within its genus, the reed bunting is most closely related to the Japanese reed bunting and the reed bunting, which are sometimes classified as being in the genus Schoeniclus. 

The genus name Emberiza is from Old German Embritz, a bunting. The English name and the specific pallasii commemorate German naturalist and explorer Peter Simon Pallas.
It breeds across northern and central Asia across to Mongolia. It is a migrant, which winters in south east Asia. It is a very rare vagrant to western Europe, but has occurred as far west as Great Britain.

Subspecies
Three subspecies are recognised- E. p. polaris, which occurs in most of northeast European Russia, north Kamchatka and winters in eastern China, E. p. pallasi which is found in Mongolia and Transbaikalia and winters in west and north China and E. p. lydiae, which occurs in south Siberia, northern Mongolia and winters in north China.

Habitat
It is common in tundra scrub by water, and also breeds in drier open areas such as open larch forest.

Description
The Pallas's reed bunting is a small passerine bird, similar to a small reed bunting. It has a small seed-eater's bill. The male has a black head and throat, white neck collar and underparts, and a heavily streaked grey back (reed bunting has a browner back). The female is much duller, with a streaked brown head. It is less streaked below than female reed bunting.

The song of the male is a repetitive sherp.

Behaviour
Its natural food consists of insects when feeding young, and otherwise seeds.

Breeding
Breeding occurs between June and August, being earlier in the north of its range. The nest is in a bush, typically made from grasses and sedges, lined with finer materials such as smaller grasses and hair. 3-5 cream-coloured eggs are laid, which show the hair-like markings characteristic of those of buntings. The incubation period is 11 days.

References

Pallas's reed bunting
Birds of North Asia
Birds of Mongolia
Pallas's reed bunting
Pallas's reed bunting